Chalcidoptera is a genus of moths of the family Crambidae.

Species
Chalcidoptera alimenalis (Walker, 1859)
Chalcidoptera appensalis (Snellen, 1884)
Chalcidoptera argyrophoralis Hampson, 1912
Chalcidoptera atrilobalis Hampson, 1896
Chalcidoptera bilunalis Hampson, 1898
Chalcidoptera contraria Gaede, 1917
Chalcidoptera emissalis Walker, [1866]
Chalcidoptera nigricans Gaede, 1917
Chalcidoptera orbidiscalis Hampson, 1918
Chalcidoptera pryeri Hampson, 1899
Chalcidoptera rufilinealis Swinhoe, 1895
Chalcidoptera thermographa Hampson, 1912
Chalcidoptera thermographalis Strand, 1920
Chalcidoptera trogobasalis Hampson, 1912

Former species
Chalcidoptera aethiops Gaede, 1917

References

Spilomelinae
Crambidae genera
Taxa named by Arthur Gardiner Butler